Steve Schnur is Worldwide Executive and President of Music for Electronic Arts (EA), the largest video game producer in the world and home to titles like Madden NFL, The Sims and Medal of Honor.

Schnur was born in Scotch Plains, New Jersey, where he graduated from Scotch Plains-Fanwood High School in 1979. He has been a label and music publishing company President, TV executive producer, music supervisor, professional musician, songwriter, composer, record producer and more. At age 7, Schnur began to study guitar, piano, composition, production and arrangement at Carnegie Hall. By his early teens, he was playing piano in pop, rock and jazz bands with seasoned musicians.

Professional development
He attended New York University’s School Of Music Business & Technology, and met MTV co-founder, Les Garland;. He later became part of the programming department at MTV and was part of the video launches of Madonna, Michael Jackson, The Cure, Mötley Crüe. Schnur went on to hold various executive positions in promotions, marketing and A&R with Elektra Records, (1985-1990) and (1991-1992), Chrysalis Records, (1990-1991), Arista Records, (1992-1995), Arista Nashville, (1995-1999), and Capitol Records, (1999-2001) - helping to orchestrate the breakthroughs of many major artists, which included Metallica, Sarah McLachlan, Coldplay, Bjork, Brad Paisley and more. He also served as music supervisor for hit movies ‘Cruel Intentions’ and ‘Miss Congeniality,’ which received a Golden Globe nomination for Best Original Song. Schnur also oversaw feature films such as, IMNOMAD, Gun Shy, Sliding Doors, Excess Baggage and Teaching Mrs. Tingle.

In 2001, Schnur joined Electronic Arts as Worldwide Executive of EA Music Group and is responsible for the creation and development of the global vision for music integration and marketing surrounding EA games. He has influenced visions for franchises such as NHL, NBA, NASCAR, Madden NFL, FIFA and Need for Speed and through those initiatives he has helped launched the careers of various artists. Some of those artists have included Thirty Seconds to Mars, Robyn, Fall Out Boy, K’naaan, Katy Perry, Imagine Dragons, Kings of Leon, The Weeknd, and Florence + The Machine.

He has overseen the orchestration and production of 50 EA soundtrack albums – including original scores for The Sims, Mass Effect, Dragon Age, Medal of Honor, and Star Wars: Battlefront with composers that have included Mark Mothersbaugh, Michael Giacchino, Junkie XL, Steve Jablonsky and Hans Zimmer. His efforts have earned EA over 50 soundtrack nominations over the last 10 years.

In 2010, he formed Artwerk Music and Music Publishing Group and directly signed, developed and launched artists – including alternative breakthrough acts Matt & Kim, Chromeo, Airbourne and Ladytron – for publishing, master recordings, sync deals and distribution.

In 2011, he produced the No.1 Billboard hit “Dance On” and the Top 5 hit, “Undivided” featuring Snoop Dogg.

In 2012, he was Creator and Executive Producer of the E! Network television series “Opening Act,” which starred Lady Gaga, Rod Stewart, Nicki Minaj, Gym Class Heroes, LMFAO, and Jason Aldean.

In 2015, Schnur signed to an exclusive worldwide songwriter agreement with Sea Gayle Music, home to writers Brad Paisley and Brandy Clark.

Associations
Currently serves on the City of Hope board and Belmont University's Mike Curb College of Entertainment & Music board, where he acts as an adjunct professor. He is a voting member of the Grammy's Producers & Engineers Wing, advisor to the Nashville and Tribeca Film Festivals, Music Advisor to Major League Soccer as well as the U.S. National Men's and Women's soccer teams and has served as both Chairman and Chairman Emeritus of The Grammy Foundation. Additionally, he is a former board member of the Country Music Association.

Awards and recognition
 2009: 'MUSEXPO's International Music Person of the Year
 2009: ACLU’s Bill of Rights Award
 2012: The Guild of Music Supervisor's Music Supervisor of the Year
 2014: MUSEXPO’s International Music Supervisor of the Year
 Honored by The Lili Clare Foundation
 2018: Best Music Supervision in a Video Game for FIFA 18 by The Guild of Music Supervisors
 2019: Nomination: 'Best Music Supervision in a Video Game' by The Guild of Music Supervisors
 2020: Nomination: 'Best Music Supervision in a Video Game' by The Guild of Music Supervisors
 2021: Nomination: 'Best Music Supervision in a Video Game' by The Guild of Music Supervisors
 2023: Best Music Supervision in a Video Game' by The Guild of Music Supervisors

References

Living people
21st-century American businesspeople
American chairpersons of corporations
American chief executives
American consulting businesspeople
American marketing businesspeople
American mass media company founders
American media executives
American music industry executives
American music managers
American music publishers (people)
People from Scotch Plains, New Jersey
Businesspeople from New York City
People from Nashville, Tennessee
Scotch Plains-Fanwood High School alumni
Electronic Arts employees
Year of birth missing (living people)